Néstor Díaz García (born 26 June 1992), simply known as Néstor, is a Spanish footballer who plays as a goalkeeper for CDA Navalcarnero.

Club career
Born in Sabadell, Barcelona, Catalonia, Néstor graduated with Polideportivo Ejido's youth setup. He made his debuts with SD Ponferradina's reserves in the 2011–12 campaign in Tercera División, also appearing with the main squad in Segunda División B.

On 17 July 2012 Néstor moved to Sevilla FC, being assigned to the C-team also in the fourth tier; he also appeared rarely with the B's during his spell. On 4 June 2014 he moved to another reserve team, RCD Espanyol B in the third division.

On 21 January 2015 Néstor rescinded his contract with the Pericos, and joined fellow league team Celta de Vigo B three days later. He made his first team – and La Liga – debut on 23 August, coming on as a late substitute for injured Rubén Blanco in a 2–1 away win against Levante UD.

References

External links

1992 births
Living people
Sportspeople from Sabadell
Spanish footballers
Footballers from Catalonia
Association football goalkeepers
La Liga players
Segunda División B players
Tercera División players
SD Ponferradina B players
SD Ponferradina players
Sevilla FC C players
Sevilla Atlético players
RCD Espanyol B footballers
Celta de Vigo B players
RC Celta de Vigo players
CD Badajoz players
CD Don Benito players
CDA Navalcarnero players